The Sidney Award is a monthly journalism award given out by The Sidney Hillman Foundation to "outstanding investigative journalism in service of the common good." It is awarded to work published in an American magazine, newspaper, on an online news site or a blog or a broadcast by an American television or radio news outlet. It focuses on deeply reported investigative work that has impact.

The Sidney Hillman Foundation has been handing out various prizes in the discipline of journalism for more than fifty years. The Sidney Award was launched in 2009.

The Foundation announces the monthly winner on the second Wednesday of each month. Recipients are awarded $500 and a certificate drawn by New Yorker cartoonist Edward Sorel.

Nominations can be made by anyone.

Winners

See also
The Hillman Prize

References

External links

American journalism awards
Awards established in 2009
2009 establishments in the United States